The Villahermosa Institute of Technology (in ) is Mexican public university located in Villahermosa, Tabasco, in the Gulf of Mexico.

History 

The Institute was founded on September 12, 1974. On November 20, 1979 it moved to its current location at the Villahermosa Industrial Park.

Academics 

The Institute offers:
Bachelor's degrees in Information Technology, Management, Computer Systems Engineering, Chemical Engineering, Biochemical Engineering, Industrial Engineering and Civil Engineering. 
Master's degrees in Management, Biochemical engineering and Regional development and business planning.
 Postgraduate diplomas in Information Technology and Food Quality.

References

Public universities and colleges in Mexico
Universities and colleges in Tabasco
Educational institutions established in 1974
Villahermosa
1974 establishments in Mexico